Gyula Halasy (19 July 1891 – 20 December 1970) was a Hungarian sport shooter who competed in the 1924 Summer Olympics. In 1924 he won the gold medal in the individual trap competition. He also finished tenth with the Hungarian team in the team clay pigeons event.

References

External links
profile

1891 births
1970 deaths
People from Kisvárda
Hungarian male sport shooters
Olympic shooters of Hungary
Shooters at the 1924 Summer Olympics
Olympic gold medalists for Hungary
Trap and double trap shooters
Olympic medalists in shooting
Medalists at the 1924 Summer Olympics
Sportspeople from Szabolcs-Szatmár-Bereg County